Patrame is a small, rural panchayat village on the left (east) bank of the Netravati River in Karnataka, India. Administratively, it is under Belthangady taluk, Dakshina Kannada district, Karnataka. Patrame is the only village in its gram panchayat. The village of Patrame is 26 km from its taluk headquarters Belthangady, and 8 km by road from Dharmasthala.

Demographics
 India census, Patrame had 2,178 inhabitants, with 1,085 males (49.8%) and 1,093 females (50.2%), for a gender ratio of 1007 females per thousand males.

In the 2011 census, the village of Patrame had 2,428 inhabitants recorded.

Languages
 Tulu
 Kannada
 Beary dialect

Education
The schools in Patrame village include
 Govt. Primary school, Patrame.
 Govt. Primary school, Suryattaavu, Patrame.
 Govt. Primary school, Anaaru, Patrame.
 Sri Rama primary school and high school, Pattooru, Patrame. (Formerly, Sri Vishnumoorthi Aided Higher Primary school)
 Govt. Primary school, Badipalike, Patrame.
The medium of instruction in all the above schools is Kannada.

Revenue
The main source of income to the people living here is agriculture. Arecanut being the main crop is grown in most farms with scattered plantations of coconut, paddy, pepper, banana, vanilla, etc.

Transportation
Buses to the village ply from Dharmasthala and Uppinangady at regular intervals. Large number of jeeps connect the village to the nearby town Kokkada though the timings are irregular. Auto rickshaws can also be hired to the village from Jodumaarga at Kokkada (Kokkada Cross) and Dharmasthala.

Bus timings:

From Patrame
 To Dharmasthala at 7:15 am, 9:30 am
 To Uppinangadi (via Kokkada and Nellyadi) at 8:10 am, 11:30 am, 3:30 pm and 4:30 pm

There is good connectivity to major cities across Karnataka from Dharmasthala which includes multiple bus services to Bengaluru and Mangaluru (Bangalore) throughout the day.

Jeeps have a historic connection with the village. These multipurpose vehicles were the only means of transport before KSRTC started its bus service to Patrame. They could maneuver the toughest terrains and unpaved roads and are still used as means of transport. Multiple jeeps ply from Patrame at various times and operate on seat sharing or private rental basis.

You can hire an auto-rickshaw from Dharmasthala and Kokkada to Patrame.

The nearest airport to Patrame is Koti Chennaya International Airport , Bajpe, Mangalore, which is about 84 km by road from Patrame.

Puttur railway station (Kabaka Puttur station) is about 35 km by road from Patrame. Mangalore Central railway station is about 75 km from Patrame.

Telephone operators

BSNL Telephone exchange is located at 'Anaaru' in Patrame.

BSNL launched its 3G services in December 2018 in Patrame.

Airtel launched its 4G services in Patrame in November 2019

Cellphone coverage
 BSNL has started its mobile services recently (July 2014) in the village after multiple complaints from the villagers demanding a mobile phone tower in the village. The BSNL mobile tower is located near telephone exchange at 'Anaaru'. Airtel launched its 4G services in November 2019 and has become the 2nd mobile operator to have a mobile tower in the village and first operator to launch 4G services.

Tourist spots around Patrame
 River Kapila. (Starts at Western ghats, flows through Shishila and reaches Patrame)
 Netravati River
 Southadka - 6 km from Patrame.
 Shri Mahavishnumoorthi temple, Patrame
 Anaaru Durgaaparameshwari temple.
 Dharmasthala - 8 km from Patrame.
 Vaidyanatheshwara temple, Kokkada - Has a beautiful pond in the vicinity. (8 km from Patrame)
 Jamalabad Fort - 32 km from Patrame. 
 Shishileshwara temple, Shishila - 27 km from Patrame.

Nearby villages and towns

 Pattooru
 Nidle
 Kokkada
 Dharmasthala

Other
 Patrame has a village library located in the vicinity of Grama Panchayat office and has decent collection of books for the general public. 
 Patrame bus stop is located near the Grama Panchayat office.
 Patrame has about 4 grocery/departmental shops some of them also have a canteen/tea shop attached.

See also
 Belthangady Taluk
 Dakshina Kannada District
 Mangalore

References

External links
 http://www.downtoearth.org.in/content/another-kasaragod
 https://web.archive.org/web/20110913052223/http://cseindia.org/category/thesaurus/patrame-and-nidle
 http://patrame.blogspot.com/
 https://web.archive.org/web/20110828204556/http://locations.whereincity.com/249617/patrame/
 http://www.daijiworld.com/chan/exclusive_arch.asp?ex_id=697
 http://www.daijiworld.com/news/news_disp.asp?n_id=40030&n_tit=Beltangady%3A+Lightning+Strike+leaves+Two+Dead+near+Patrame
 https://web.archive.org/web/20020829111452/http://www.indiatogether.org/samanvaya/oct2001.htm
 http://www.environmentportal.in/node/3197?quicktabs_2=1
 http://www.deccanherald.com/content/158016/endosulfan-poisoning.html
 http://shivallibrahmins.com/tulunaadu-temples/belthangadi-taluk/temples-of-belthangadi-taluk/

Villages in Dakshina Kannada district